Khadijah Farrakhan (born Betsy Ross) is the wife of Louis Farrakhan, the Supreme Leader of the Nation of Islam. She is known as the "First Lady of the Nation of Islam".

Biography

Khadijah Farrakhan converted to Nation of Islam with her husband Louis Farrakhan, then Louis Eugene Wolcott, in 1955, when they had been married for two years. As Supreme Minister, Farrakhan enrolled in the Fruit of Islam while his wife also enrolled in the Muslim Girls Training (MGT) and General Civilization Class (GCC) under the direction of Sister Captain Anna Lois Muhammad in New York City. The Muslim sisters in Mother Khadijah's class would include many important figures such as Dr. Betty Shabazz, the late wife of Malcolm X. Mother Khadijah, as she is often called, was an eager student and quickly rose to the top of her class.  She was trained by  Elijah Muhammad.

Minister Farrakhan was subsequently promoted to be the minister of Boston's Temple No. 11.  Since both husband and wife had Boston backgrounds, they were right at home with the new posting and worked tirelessly, eventually building the New England area into one of the Nation of Islam's key developments between 1956 and  1965. In 1965, after Minister Farrakhan was promoted to the National Representative of the Hon. Elijah Muhammad and relocated to Mosque No. 7 in New York City, this husband and wife team began working to convert followers and extend the Nation of Islam's influence throughout New York City from Harlem to New Rochelle.

By 1975, Farrakhan and her family had relocated to Chicago. After Minister Farrakhan decided to rebuild the Nation of Islam under the teachings of Elijah Muhammad in 1977, she became the “new” Nation's first treasurer and secretary when the couple opened their Chicago home to host “study group” meetings. She shared her skills in office systems and communications, particularly in developing the secretarial department that helped launch many of the Nation of Islam's programs and thrusts that have become popular in mosques across the globe. As Minister Farrakhan's popularity grew, her responsibilities expanded to fund-raising, converting new members, humanitarian aid for the flood victims in the south, heading Nation of Islam delegations overseas at the opening of mosques, schools, foreign policy missions in Africa, addressing the Million Woman March in 1997, receiving and hosting visiting First Ladies of African countries, and directly helping one of the century's most important figures in Nation of Islam, her husband, Minister Louis Farrakhan. At a Saviour's Day Believer's meeting, the Minister described her as “his best friend.” On 2 June 2018 Minister Louis Farrakhan and his wife Khadijah announced the passing of their eldest son Louis Farrakhan Jr. He was 60 years old.

References

External links
Final Call article

Living people
Louis Farrakhan family
African-American Muslims
Year of birth missing (living people)
Members of the Nation of Islam
People from Chicago